OTN may refer to:
OTN1, a Canadian television channel
Open Transport Network, a specific ring-based telecommunication network architecture
Optical transport network, a telecommunication network standards framework for optical networks
Oracle Technology Network, the official online/offline community for Oracle technical professionals
Ed-Air Airport – Oaktown, Indiana, United States (IATA code: OTN)